Tamraz also spelled as Tamras (Syriac: ܬܡܪܙ) is an Assyrian and Lebanese Arabic surname. There is a plateau (Dhour Tamraz) in Bikfaya, Lebanon named after a branch of the Tamraz family that descend from Tel Keppe, Nineveh plains.

Notable people with this surname include:
Jermain Tamraz, Assyrian singer
Albert Ruel Tamras (born 1944), Assyrian singer
Victor Bet Tamraz, Assyrian pastor sentenced for Christian activities in Iran
Dabrina Bet Tamraz, Assyrian human rights activist
Mar Yohannan Tamraz, Assyrian Chaldean Catholic bishop of Kirkuk
Mar Elia Tamras, Assyrian bishop of Baghdad, Ukraine and Georgia
Mar Petros Ashor Tamras, Assyrian bishop of the Ancient Church of the East in Modesto, California
Ator Tamras, Assyrian actress and stuntwoman known for her work in e.g. Paranormal Activity 3, Spanglish and Starsky & Hutch
Lincoln Tamraz, president of the Assyrian American Federation in the 1960s
A.N. Tamrazov, Major General of Assyrian descent in the Soviet Army
I.K. Tamrazov, Major General of Assyrian descent in the Soviet Army
Cathy Baron Tamraz (born 1953), Business Wire’s Chairwoman and CEO
 Henrik Tamraz (1935–1996), Assyrian from Iran who competed in weightlifting in the Olympics
 Nayla Tamraz, Lebanese writer and art critic
 Roger Tamraz (born 1940), American banker and venture capital investor of Assyrian-Lebanese descent
 Juliana Taimoorazy (born 1973), Assyrian advocate from Iran. Founder and current President of the Iraqi Christian Relief Council
 Lily Oraham Taimoorazy (1990-1992), known as the Mother of Assyrian Folk Dancing

References

Arabic-language surnames